Shaurya Aur Suhani is a show on Star Plus which premiered on 21 March 2009. It is a fantasy based show which focuses on Shaurya and Suhani's love story. The serial is produced by Sphere Origins.

Plot 
Shaurya aur Suhani is a story about Shaurya who is destiny’s child, born to a royal family but living in the jungle as is unaware of his royal roots. To protect him at the time of his birth, he was taken away from his royal family and lived in the jungles - to grow up to be Shaurya – a strong and tough man.

This fight and struggle for his kingdom is intertwined with his romantic love story with Princess Suhani. The story portrays love story of two human beings, who are separated by class and find their way to each other's heart.

Cast 
 Saurabh Pandey as Shaurya
 Sriti Jha as Suhani
 Manish Wadhwa as Takshak
 Vineet Kumar Chaudhary as Simha
 Mohammad Nazim
 Manoj Verma as Veer Bhadra
 Shaji Choudhary as Aghor
 Lilliput as Bhasundi
 Rohit Purohit as Chitwan
 Priya Bathija
 Roshmita as Rati
 Ankit Shah as Dara
 Rahul Dosani as Chelu
 Geeta

References

External links
 Official Website
 Serial review. indiantelevisionacademy.com, 5 May 2009.

2009 Indian television series debuts
2009 Indian television series endings
Indian television series
StarPlus original programming
Indian fantasy television series